John Morris Henson (born July 11, 1967) is an American comedian, actor, and talk show host. He was the co-host of ABC's Wipeout with John Anderson, a prime-time game show that ran for 7 seasons.

Biography 
Henson was born in Stamford, Connecticut, to Joe and Barbara (née Wright) Henson. He has four older brothers, one of whom is Dan Henson, the President and CEO of GE Capital, Americas. Another is Frank (Bubba) Henson, a teacher at St. Luke's School in New Canaan, Connecticut. He studied acting at Boston University, Circle in the Square, Playwrights Horizons and Three of Us Studios in New York City. He has starred in various theater productions such as
Rosencrantz and Guildenstern Are Dead,
Conduct Unbecoming, Heinous Crimes and Other Delights, The Greenhouse Effect and Remote Evolution.

Henson was born with a white streak of hair on the right side of his head. As a result, he received the nickname "Skunk Boy" while hosting Talk Soup.

Henson attended St. Luke's School in New Canaan, Connecticut.

Career 
Henson began his career as a stand-up comic. He started appearing in films in the mid to late 1990s. He was the longest-running host (four years) of Talk Soup on the E! Entertainment Network, hosting just over 1,000 shows in the four and a half years he was with the network. During his stint as host of Talk Soup, he appeared as a guest on Space Ghost Coast to Coast. In 2004, he was the host of The John Henson Project, a short-lived comedy-reality show on Spike TV, and hosted several broadcast specials including ABC's Best Commercials You've Never Seen, ABC's Best TV You've Never Seen and, most recently, the 33rd Annual Daytime Creative Arts Emmy Awards. From 2005 to 2007, Henson was the co-host of Watch This!, a daily television show on the TV Guide Channel. Henson has also produced numerous field segments on the entertainment industry for MSNBC and CNN and, additionally, had a small recurring role as a local newscaster on My Name Is Earl.

From 2008 to 2014, Henson co-hosted the ABC obstacle course game-show, Wipeout, and always ended the show with the catch phrase, "Good night, and Big Balls", a reference to the signature obstacle in the show.

From 2017 to 2022, Henson hosted Halloween Baking Championship on Food Network.

Henson has also appeared in the Blink-182 music video for "What's My Age Again?"

Filmography

Television 
Space Ghost Coast to Coast – (1997–1998)
The View
Politically Incorrect
Remember WENN
Stand Up, Stand Up
Two Drink Minimum
Caroline's Comedy Hour
2006 LA Area Emmy Awards
Talk Soup – 1995–1999
The Best Commercials You've Never Seen – (1998)
The John Henson Project – (2004)
Watch This! – (2006)
Wipeout – (2008–2014)
My Name Is Earl – 2009
Who Wants to Be a Millionaire (Host) – 2010
WordGirl (voice of Captain Tangent) – (2010)
Austin & Ally – (2012)
Kick Buttowski: Suburban Daredevil (voice) – 2012
The Funniest Commercials of The Year: 2012 – 2012
Anger Management – 2014
Penn Zero: Part-Time Hero – 2015
Worst Cooks in America: Celebrity Edition – 2016
iWitness – 2017
Voltron: Legendary Defender (voice of Bob) – 2018
Halloween Baking Challenge (Host) – 2018-present

 Film Meet Wally Sparks – 1997Stag – 1997 as Timan BernardBlink 182: The Urethra Chronicles – 1999Bar Hopping – 2002 as RogerLife Without Dick – 2002

 Podcast 

 Painkiller Already'' #325 – 2017

References

External links 
 

1967 births
20th-century American male actors
21st-century American male actors
American male comedians
American male film actors
American male stage actors
American male television actors
American stand-up comedians
American television talk show hosts
Living people
Male actors from Stamford, Connecticut
20th-century American comedians
21st-century American comedians